
Year 1558 (MDLVIII) was a common year starting on Saturday (link will display the full calendar) of the Julian calendar.

Events 

 January–June 
 January 7 – French troops, led by Francis, Duke of Guise, take Calais, the last continental possession of the Kingdom of England, in the Siege of Calais.
 January 22 – The Livonian War begins.
 February 2 – The University of Jena is founded in Thuringia, Germany.
 February 5 – Arauco War: Pedro de Avendaño, with sixty men, captures Caupolicán (the Mapuche Gran Toqui), who is leading their first revolt against the Spanish Empire (near Antihuala), encamped with a small band of followers.
 March 8 – The city of Pori was founded by Duke John on the shores of the Gulf of Bothnia.
 April 24 – Mary, Queen of Scots, marries Francis, Dauphin of France, at Notre Dame de Paris.

 July–December 
 July 13 – Battle of Gravelines: In France, Spanish forces led by Lamoral, Count of Egmont defeat the French forces of Marshal Paul de Thermes.
 July 18 – The city of Tartu, capital of the Bishopric of Dorpat (in modern-day Estonia) surrenders to Russia.
 October 17 – Postal history of Poland: King Sigismund II Augustus appoints an Italian merchant living in Kraków to organise a consolidated postal service in Poland, the origin of Poczta Polska.
 November 17 – The Elizabethan era begins in England: Catholic Queen Mary dies, and is succeeded by her younger Protestant half-sister Elizabeth, who will rule for 44 years.

 Unknown  
 John Knox's attack on female rulers, The First Blast of the Trumpet Against the Monstruous Regiment of Women, is published anonymously from Geneva.
 English explorer Anthony Jenkinson travels from Moscow to Astrakhan and Bukhara. He is the first Englishman to note that the Amu Darya changed course, to start flowing into the Aral Sea.
 Queen Elizabeth I of England grants rest and refreshment to pilgrims and travellers who pass by the Holy Well Spring at Malvern in England.

 Ongoing 
 1557 influenza pandemic.

Births 

 January or February – Hendrik Goltzius, Dutch painter (d. 1617)
 January 16 – Jakobea of Baden, Margravine of Baden by birth, Duchess of Jülich-Cleves-Berg by marriage (d. 1597)
 January 29 – Paul Hentzner, German lawyer (d. 1623)
 March 7 – Johann VII, Duke of Mecklenburg, Duke of Mecklenburg-Schwerin (1576–1592) (d. 1592)
 April 30 – Mikołaj Oleśnicki the younger, Polish noble (d. 1629)
 June 15 – Margrave Andrew of Burgau, German nobleman, Cardinal, Bishop of Constance and Brixen (d. 1600)
 July 9 – David Origanus, German astronomer (d. 1628)
 July 11 – Robert Greene, English dramatist (d. 1592)
 August 2 – Herman van den Bergh, Dutch soldier in the Eighty Years' War (d. 1611)
 August 8 – George Clifford, 3rd Earl of Cumberland, English noble (d. 1605)
 August 19 – François de Bourbon, Prince of Conti (d. 1614)
 September 9 – Philippe Emmanuel, Duke of Mercœur, French soldier (d. 1602)
 September 24 – Ralph Eure, 3rd Baron Eure, English politician (d. 1617)
 October 12 – Maximilian III, Archduke of Austria (d. 1618)
 October 24 – Szymon Szymonowic, Polish writer (d. 1629)
 October 30 – Jacques-Nompar de Caumont, duc de La Force, Marshal of France (d. 1652)
 November 27 – Mingyi Swa, Crown Prince of Burma (d. 1593)
 December 3 – Gregorio Pagani, Italian painter (d. 1605)
 December 8 – François de La Rochefoucauld, French Catholic cardinal (d. 1645)
 December 9 – André du Laurens, French physician (d. 1609)
 date unknown
 Meir Lublin, Polish rabbi (d. 1616)
 Kōriki Masanaga, Japanese military commander (d. 1599)
 Bessho Nagaharu, Japanese nobleman (d. 1580)
 Olivier van Noort, first Dutchman to circumnavigate the world (d. 1627)
 Chidiock Tichborne, English conspirator and poet (d. 1586)
 Michael the Brave, Prince of Wallachia (1593–1601) (d. 1601)
 Thomas Kyd, English playwright (d. 1594)
 Françoise de Cezelli, French war hero (d. 1615)
 probable - Pierre Dugua, Sieur de Mons, French merchant (d. 1628)

Deaths 

 January 28 – Jacob Micyllus, German humanist (b. 1503)
 February 25 – Eleanor of Austria, Queen of Portugal and France (b. 1498)
 February 27
 Johann Faber of Heilbronn, controversial Catholic preacher (b. 1504)
 Kunigunde of Brandenburg-Kulmbach, German noblewoman (b. 1524)
 March 6 – Luca Gaurico, Italian astrologer (b. 1475)
 March 24 – Anna van Egmont, Countess of Egmond and Buren (b. c. 1533)
 March 25 – Marcos de Niza, French Franciscan explorer (b. c. 1495)
 April 2 – Wolfgang of the Palatinate, Count Palatine of Neumarkt (b. 1494)
 April 15 – Hurrem Sultan, Ruthenian-born wife of Suleiman the Magnificent (b. c. 1500)
 April 20 – Johannes Bugenhagen, German reformer (b. 1485)
 April 26 – Jean Fernel, French physician (b. 1497)
 May 17 – Francisco de Sá de Miranda, Portuguese poet (b. 1485)
 May 19 – Juan Téllez-Girón, 4th Count of Ureña, Spanish count (b. 1494)
 May 25 – Elisabeth of Brandenburg, Duchess of Brunswick-Calenberg-Göttingen (1525–1540) (b. 1510)
 May 31 – Philip Hoby, English politician (b. 1505)
 June 28 – Thomas Darcy, 1st Baron Darcy of Chiche, English courtier (b. 1506)
 July 17 – George I of Württemberg-Mömpelgard (b. 1498)
 August 11 – Justus Menius, German Lutheran pastor (b. 1499)
 September 21 – Charles V, Holy Roman Emperor (b. 1500)
 October – Mellin de Saint-Gelais, French poet (b. c. 1491)
 October 18 – Maria of Austria, queen of Louis II of Hungary and Bohemia (b. 1505)
 October 21 – J. C. Scaliger, Italian scholar (b. 1484)
 November 1
 Anne Brooke, Baroness Cobham, English noble (b. 1501)
 Erhard Schnepf, German theologian (b. 1495)
 November 15 – Gilbert Kennedy, 3rd Earl of Cassilis, Scottish politician and judge (b. 1515)
 November 17
 (bur.) Hugh Aston, English composer (b. 1485)
 Queen Mary I of England (b. 1516)
 Reginald Pole, Cardinal Archbishop of Canterbury (b. 1500)
 December 7 – Johann Forster, German theologian (b. 1496)
 December 16 – Thomas Cheney, Lord Warden of the Cinque Ports (b. c. 1485)
 December 19 – Cornelius Grapheus, Flemish writer (b. 1482)
 December 28 – Hermann Finck, German composer (b. 1527)
 date unknown
 Archibald Campbell, 4th Earl of Argyll, Scottish nobleman and politician (b. 1507)
 Robert Recorde, Welsh physician and mathematician (b. c. 1512)

References